Michael Baum may refer to:
 Michael Baum (surgeon)
 Michael Baum (entrepreneur)